The 139th Pennsylvania House of Representatives District is located in Northeastern Pennsylvania and has been represented since 2023 by Joseph Adams.

District profile
The 139th Pennsylvania House of Representatives District is located in Pike County, Pennsylvania and Wayne County, Pennsylvania. It includes Grey Towers National Historic Site. It is made up of the following areas:

 Pike County, Pennsylvania 
 Blooming Grove Township
 Dingman  Township
 Greene Township
 Lackawaxen Township
 Matamoras
 Milford
 Milford Township
 Palmyra Township
 Shohola  Township
 Westfall Township
 Wayne County, Pennsylvania
 Cherry Ridge Township
 Dreher Township
 Hawley
 Lake Township
 Lehigh Township
 Palmyra Township
 Paupack Township
 Salem Township
 South Canaan Township
 Sterling Township

Representatives

Recent election results

References

External links
District map from the United States Census Bureau
Pennsylvania House Legislative District Maps from the Pennsylvania Redistricting Commission.  
Population Data for District 139 from the Pennsylvania Redistricting Commission.

139
Government of Pike County, Pennsylvania
Government of Wayne County, Pennsylvania